Glenn E. "Smiles" Mosley (born December 26, 1955) is an American former professional basketball player for the Philadelphia 76ers and San Antonio Spurs of the National Basketball Association (NBA). Mosley also played for part of one season in the Continental Basketball Association for the Lancaster Red Roses in 1978, and after his NBA career he played abroad in Italy, France and Argentina. While playing for CSP Limoges in France, Mosley won the Ligue Nationale de Basketball and Korać Cup in 1983.

Mosley, from Newark, New Jersey, played college basketball at Seton Hall University in nearby South Orange. He played for the Pirates from 1973–74 to 1976–77 where compiled career totals of 1,441 points and 1,263 rebounds. Mosley's 15.2 rebounds per game for his career lists high on the NCAA's all-time list, and his 16.3 per game as a senior led all of NCAA Division I.

The Philadelphia 76ers selected him in the first round (20th overall) in the 1977 NBA Draft. After two years in the league with two different teams, Mosley embarked on his international professional career.

See also
List of NCAA Division I men's basketball season rebounding leaders

References

External links
Glenn Mosley at TheDraftReview

1955 births
Living people
African-American basketball players
American expatriate basketball people in Argentina
American expatriate basketball people in France
American expatriate basketball people in Italy
American expatriate basketball people in the Philippines
American men's basketball players
Basketball players from Newark, New Jersey
Crispa Redmanizers players
Ferro Carril Oeste basketball players
Lancaster Red Roses (CBA) players
Limoges CSP players
Pallacanestro Treviso players
Philadelphia 76ers draft picks
Philadelphia 76ers players
Philippine Basketball Association imports
Power forwards (basketball)
San Antonio Spurs players
Seton Hall Pirates men's basketball players
21st-century African-American people
20th-century African-American sportspeople